In enzymology, an urate-ribonucleotide phosphorylase is an enzyme that catalyzes the chemical reaction

urate D-ribonucleotide + phosphate  urate + alpha-D-ribose 1-phosphate

Thus, the two substrates of this enzyme are urate D-ribonucleotide and phosphate, whereas its two products are urate and alpha-D-ribose 1-phosphate.

This enzyme belongs to the family of glycosyltransferases, specifically the pentosyltransferases.  The systematic name of this enzyme class is urate-ribonucleotide:phosphate alpha-D-ribosyltransferase. Other names in common use include UAR phosphorylase, and urate-ribonucleotide:phosphate D-ribosyltransferase.  This enzyme participates in purine metabolism.

References 

 

EC 2.4.2
Enzymes of unknown structure